John Bramblitt (born 1971) is an American blind painter. He is the only blind muralist in the world with murals in New York and Dallas. Bramblitt is known for his bright colors and a style that mix impressionism combined with the modern feel of pop art. Bramblitt's art has gone to over 120 countries around the world, and he is known for his interactive speaking events, lectures, and free art workshops where everyone paints together no matter their ability or disability.

Bramblitt was born in El Paso, Texas and began painting after losing his sight in 2001 after a series of severe seizures. He fell into a deep depression until he found painting. He managed to distinguish two different colours by feeling their textures. He also feels his subjects in order to paint them. Bramblitt has been the subject of multiple media stories, including an award-winning documentary and a video that was voted Most Inspirational Video of 2008 for YouTube. He was awarded three U.S. presidential service awards in 2005, 2006, and 2007 for his creation of a series of free art workshops designed to bring art to people and neighborhoods lacking access to art instruction. 

Bramblitt also authored the book Shouting in the Dark. He still paints and lives in Denton, Texas with his wife and son.

While he was a student at the University of North Texas, Bramblitt was featured on Bob Phillips' syndicated television anthology series, Texas Country Reporter.

References

External links 
Official Site
WFAA - YouTube
Texas Country Reporter - YouTube
Longview News Journal
CBS
CNN

American blind people
20th-century American painters
American male painters
21st-century American painters
Living people
1971 births
20th-century American male artists